RAS Records, also known as Real Authentic Sound, is a reggae record label.

History
RAS Records was founded in 1979 by Doctor Dread. In his travels to Jamaica he created a network within the reggae artist community there. By the early to mid-1980s, RAS had signed artists such as Black Uhuru, Inner Circle, Culture, Junior Reid, Yellowman, and Freddie McGregor. This allowed RAS to grow significantly throughout the world. To date, the label has also signed artists including Luciano, The Wailers Band, Sizzla and Tony Rebel.

Awards
Over the years, several RAS artists have been nominated for a Grammy Award. In 1996, Bunny Wailer received an award for his tribute album, Hall of Fame: A Tribute to Bob Marley's 50th Anniversary.

RAS artists
Luciano
The Wailers Band
Junior Reid
Culture
Black Uhuru
Inner Circle
Don Carlos
Yellowman
J.C. Lodge
Freddie McGregor
Sanchez
Israel Vibration
Steel Pulse
Mad Cobra
Mikey Spice
Tiger
Gregory Isaacs
Brigadier Jerry
Pinchers
Eek-A-Mouse
Half Pint
Peter Broggs

See also
List of record labels

References

External links
 RAS Records website
Discography at Discogs

American record labels
Record labels established in 1979
Reggae record labels